Tyrone Thurman (born December 31, 1966) is a former American football wide receiver. He played at the college level at Texas Tech, where he earned All-American honors as a kick returner and played for teams in both the Arena Football League and Canadian Football League.

Career

High school
Thurman played at the running back position at Robert E. Lee High School in Midland, Texas under coach Spike Dykes.

College

Due to his small size at 5' 4" and 126 pounds, Thurman received little interest from Division I schools before being recruited to Texas Tech University with the hiring of  his former high school coach Spike Dykes as the defensive coordinator for the Red Raiders in 1984. Thurman would play at the wide receiver position, but earned his accolades as a punt returner.

Thurman would play from 1985-1988, and earned Associated Press All-American 1st Team honors as a kick returner during his senior year in 1988. Thurman concluded his career holding several school records including longest punt return at 96 yards, return yards in a season (444 in 1986), returns in a career (126) and yards in a career (1,466). Several records still stand in 2013, with some having been broken by Mosi Tatupu Award winner Wes Welker.

Professional

Thurman went undrafted in 1989 before being signed as a free agent for the Dallas Cowboys. He was cut from the roster before the 1989 season began and spent several years in both the Canadian Football League and the Arena Football League playing for teams including the Ottawa Rough Riders, Dallas Texans (Arena), Las Vegas Sting, Connecticut Coyotes and Texas Terror.

References

1966 births
Living people
Players of American football from Texas
People from Midland, Texas
Texas Tech Red Raiders football players
All-American college football players
Dallas Cowboys players
Ottawa Rough Riders players
Dallas Texans (Arena) players
Las Vegas Sting players
Connecticut Coyotes players
Texas Terror players
American football wide receivers
American football return specialists
African-American players of American football
People from Irving, Texas
Robert E. Lee High School (Midland, Texas) alumni
21st-century African-American people
20th-century African-American sportspeople